Beau Starr (born September 1, 1944) is an American actor who has starred in movies and on television. He is known for his film role as Sheriff Ben Meeker in the 1988 hit horror movie Halloween 4: The Return of Michael Myers; he reprised his role in the 1989 sequel Halloween 5: The Revenge of Michael Myers. Many also remember him as Lt. Harding Welsh in Due South.

Starr was born in Queens, New York, to a retail employee mother and a meatpacker father. His brother is actor Mike Starr. Beau Starr's well-known television role was in the 1990s Canadian television series Due South as Lieutenant Harding Welsh of the Chicago Police Department. He also starred in the 1980s television series Rituals, Bizarre and True Blue. He has starred in several made-for-television movies, and appeared in a number of productions based in Canada, including Due South, Sue Thomas: F.B.Eye and Doc as well as some advertisements.

His first feature film role was in the 1982 comedy film Hanky Panky with Gene Wilder and Gilda Radner. He also appeared in Carl Reiner's 1987 comedy Summer School, Martin Scorsese's hit 1990 crime drama Goodfellas as Henry Hill's father, and in the 2005 drama Cinderella Man. Starr made many guest appearances on television series, including T.J. Hooker, The A-Team, Knight Rider, Hill Street Blues, V: The Series, Hunter, The 4400, A Nero Wolfe Mystery and  NYPD Blue.

Filmography
 Hanky Panky (1982) as Cop PassengerShocktrauma (1982) as Gene KowalskiThree's Company (1983) as OfficerThe Lonely Guy (1984) as 2nd CopCity Heat (1984) as Pitt LookoutLove on the Run (1985) as Lieutenant SturgesFletch (1985) as WillyHollywood Vice Squad (1986) as FarberThe Check Is in the Mail... (1986) as RoccoJo Jo Dancer, Your Life Is Calling (1986) as VitoSummer School (1987) as Mr. GrempHalloween 4: The Return of Michael Myers (1988) as Sheriff Ben MeekerNight Court (1988) as SheldonRelentless (1989) as Ike TaylorHalloween 5: The Revenge of Michael Myers (1989) as Sheriff Ben MeekerBorn on the Fourth of July (1989) as Man #2 - Arthur's BarGoodfellas (1990) as Henry's FatherThe Perfect Weapon (1991) as Captain Carl SandersDead Silence (1991) as Detective BartonJoshua Tree (1993) as Detective Jack 'Rudy' RudisillThe November Men (1993) as Chief Agent GrangerBad Blood (1994) as BoSpeed (1994) as Police CommissionerDue South (1994-1999, TV Series) as Lieutenant Harding Welsh Trial by Jury (1994) as PhillieDevil in a Blue Dress (1995) as Detective Jack MillerNever Talk to Strangers (1995) as GroganHoodlum (1997) as Jules SalkeMen (1997) as Tony, Wine TasterThe Corruptor (1999) as Captain Stan KleinPrisoner of Love (1999) as WaltShadow Hours (2000) as Jeremiah WalkerMercy (2000) as Lieutenant FritchThe Golden Spiders: A Nero Wolfe Mystery (2000) as 'Lips' EganThe Cactus Kid (2000) as Police CaptainThe Day Reagan Was Shot (2001) as FBI Special Agent CageA Nero Wolfe Mystery (2001–2002, Before I Die / Disguise for Murder / Door to Death / The Next Witness) as Thomas 'Thumbs' Meeker / Malcolm Vedder / Lieutenant Noonan / Judge CorbettPretend You Don't See Her (2002) as Detective Ed SloanMen with Brooms (2002) as Scott BlendickMy Name Is Tanino (2002) as OmobonoAgainst the Ropes (2004) as CorcoranWhere the Truth Lies (2005) as Jack ScagliaCinderella Man (2005) as SamIt's Me...Gerald (2005, TV Series) as TroyFinal Days of Planet Earth (2006, mini series) as OliverCode Name: The Cleaner'' (2007) as Old Timer

References

External links

1944 births
American male film actors
American male television actors
Living people
People from Queens, New York
Male actors from New York City
American expatriate actors in Canada